L'Inconnue de la Seine (English: The Unknown Woman of the Seine) was an unidentified young woman whose putative death mask became a popular fixture on the walls of artists' homes after 1900. Her visage inspired numerous literary works.

History
According to an oft-repeated story, the body of the young woman was pulled out of the River Seine at the Quai du Louvre in Paris around the late 1880s. Since the body showed no signs of violence, suicide was suspected. A pathologist at the Paris Morgue was, according to the story, so taken by her beauty that he felt compelled to make a wax plaster cast death mask of her face. It has been questioned whether the expression of the face could belong to a drowned person.

According to the draughtsman Georges Villa, who received this information from his master, the painter Jules Joseph Lefebvre, the impression was taken from the face of a young model who died of tuberculosis around 1875, but no trace of the original cast remained. According to other accounts, the mask was taken from the daughter of a mask manufacturer in Germany. The identity of the girl was never discovered.  Claire Forestier estimated the age of the model at no more than 16, given the firmness of the skin.

In the following years, numerous copies were produced. The copies quickly became a fashionable, albeit morbid, fixture in Parisian Bohemian society. Albert Camus and others compared her enigmatic smile to that of the Mona Lisa, evoking much speculation as to what clues the seemingly happy expression, perceived as eerily serene, on her face could offer about her life, her death, and her place in society.

The popularity of the figure is also of interest to the history of artistic media, relating to its widespread reproduction. The original cast had been photographed, and new casts were created from the film negatives. These new casts displayed details that are usually lost in bodies taken from the water, but the apparent preservation of these details in the face of the cast seemed to only reinforce its authenticity.

Critic Al Alvarez wrote in his book on suicide, The Savage God: "I am told that a whole generation of German girls modeled their looks on her." According to Hans Hesse of the University of Sussex, Alvarez reports, "the  became the erotic ideal of the period, as Bardot was for the 1950s. He thinks that German actresses such as Elisabeth Bergner modeled themselves on her. She was finally displaced as a paradigm by Greta Garbo."

As of 2017 a workshop called  in Arcueil made plaster death masks from a 19th-century mold, which is said to be that of  de la Seine.

Artistic portrayals

English literature

Literature of Great Britain 
The earliest mention can be found in Richard Le Gallienne's 1900 novella The Worshipper of the Image, in which an English poet falls in love with the mask, eventually leading to the death of his daughter and the suicide of his wife.

An image of  has been used on the cover illustration for the family history mystery novel A Habit of Dying by DJ Wiseman.

Literature of North America 
 is referenced in William Gaddis' 1955 novel The Recognitions.

The story is deeply tied to the themes and images of the book.

Referenced as the origin of the CPR doll by Chuck Palahniuk in "Exodus", a story in Haunted.

Kathy Reichs' forensic anthropologist character, Temperance Brennan, discusses the  case with a colleague in the 2021 crime novel  The Bone Code.

Brooks Hansen's 2021 novel The Unknown Woman of the Seine hypothesizes the story of the young woman before her drowning.

French literature 
Maurice Blanchot, who owned one of the masks, described her as "a young girl with closed eyes, enlivened by a smile so relaxed and at ease ... that one could have believed that she drowned in an instant of extreme happiness".

In Louis Aragon's 1944 novel ,  played a significant role as one of the main characters attempts to rejuvenate the mask from various photographs. In the early 1960s, Man Ray contributed photographs to a new edition of the work.

In 2012, Didier Blonde wrote a novel called , about a man in Paris who stumbles upon a copy of the mask in an antiques store, and who tries to find out more about the girl it was modelled after.

German literature 
The protagonist of Rainer Maria Rilke's only novel, Die Aufzeichnungen des Malte Laurids Brigge (1910), reflects:

In 1926 Ernst Benkard published , a book about 126 death masks, writing about our subject that she is "like a delicate butterfly to us, who, carefree and exhilarated, fluttered right into the lamp of life, scorching her fine wings."

Reinhold Conrad Muschler's 1934 widely translated best-selling novel,  tells the maudlin story of the fate of the provincial orphan Madeleine Lavin, who has fallen in love with the British diplomat Lord Thomas Vernon Bentick and, after a romance, commits suicide in the Seine when Bentick returns to his fiancée. This novel was turned into a film of the same name in 1936.

A male pathologist was said to have recorded the face of an unidentified young woman who, around the age of sixteen, according to his story, had been found drowned in the River Seine at Paris, around the late 1880s. The pathologist at the Paris Morgue was so taken by her beauty that he worked for hours to make a plaster cast of her face. She was considered so beautiful that the worker said: "Her beauty was breathtaking, and showed few signs of distress at the time of passing. So bewitching that I knew beauty as such must be preserved." The cast was also known as "Bewitching Woman", a nickname that never caught on. The cast was also compared to the Mona Lisa, and other famous paintings and sculptures, so much so that, in the following years, copies of the mask became fashionable figures in Parisian Bohemian society. Other accounts state that the cast was taken from a young German mistress (or alternatively said to be the man's natural-born, that is, illegitimate, daughter) who bore the child of a mask-maker who sold the cast and then committed suicide (in the Seine) when her baby was stillborn.

Other examples appear in:
 Alfred Döblin's essay, "Of Faces, Pictures, and their Truth" (published as an introduction to photographer August Sander's 1929 collection Face of our Time.
 Hertha Pauli's 1931 story , which first appeared in the Berliner Tageblatt
 Ödön von Horváth's play based on his friend Hertha Pauli's story, written in 1934 and titled .
 Claire Goll's 1936 short story "", in which the protagonist peers into a death mask and dies from a heart attack caused by delusion and guilt as he believes he recognizes the face as his daughter.
 U-Boat commander Herbert Werner mentions having a copy of the cast on his wall in his parents' house in his memoir Iron Coffins
 Max Frisch's 1955 play  features  as one of several historical figures

Slavic literatures 
Czech poet Vítězslav Nezval wrote the poem "", inspired by the story, in 1929.

It has been argued that this poem has as much to do with the Slavic myth of rusalka as with the mask itself.

Ballet 
In 1963, Bentley Stone choreographed a version of L'Inconnue to music by Francis Poulenc for the Stone-Camryn Ballet. It premiered with a cast that included Ruth Ann Koesun  and John Kriza. That ballet was moved to the American Ballet Theatre in 1965, with Koesun and Kriza reprising their roles, and with Christine Sarry taking the role of the "River Girl".

Film 

Used in the film The Screaming Skull, in 1958 as the image of the dead wife.

Music 
"" is track number four on the 2018 Beach House album, 7. German bitpop group Welle:Erdball included the track "" on their 2017 album Gaudeamus Igitur.

"Rescue Annie" also tells a version of the story on Frank Turner's 2019 Album No Man's Land.

Photography
Albert Rudomine made a portrait of the death mask in 1927. The blissful expression of the unknown dead girl was the inspiration for Yvonne Chevalier's 1935 recreation later titled Ophélie Man Ray in 1966 made a series of surrealist mises-en-scène pictures of a cast, in one case placing it on a pillow in bed, and these are held in the collection of the Centre Pompidou.

CPR doll 

The face of the unknown woman was used for the head of the first aid mannequin Resusci Anne. It was created by Peter Safar and Asmund Laerdal in 1958 and was used starting in 1960 in numerous CPR courses. For this reason, the face has been called "the most kissed face" of all time.

See also
Evelyn McHale
Resusci Anne
List of unsolved deaths

References

External links
Episode of Radiolab discussing L'Inconnue de la Seine

19th-century births
Death masks
Masks in Europe
Unidentified decedents
Unidentified people
Year of birth unknown